Aljmaš can refer to:

 Aljmaš, Croatia, a village near Erdut, Croatia
 Aljmaš or Bácsalmás, a village in Hungary
 Aljmaš or Almaš, a former village in Bačka, Vojvodina, Serbia